Calochilus cleistanthus, commonly known as the pallid beard orchid, is a species of orchid endemic to Queensland. It has up to four small, pale green to yellowish green flowers which remain closed and the plant is apparently leafless. It is only known from a single location on the Cape York Peninsula.

Description
Calochilus cleistanthus is a terrestrial, perennial, deciduous, herb with an underground tuber but is apparently leafless. The flowers do not open, but are held horizontally for about one day, then become erect. Unlike most others in the genus, the labellum lacks a "beard" and sham "eyes". The flowers appear from December to January.

Taxonomy and naming
Calochilus cleistanthus was first formally described in 2004 by David Jones and the description was published in The Orchadian from specimens collected on Cape York. The specific epithet (cleistanthus) is derived from the Ancient Greek words kleistos meaning "shut" or "closed" and anthos meaning "flower".

Distribution and habitat
The pallid beard orchid grows in swampy places with rushes and sedges in woodland and is only known from the type location.

References

cleistanthus
Orchids of Australia
Orchids of Queensland
Plants described in 2004